Trombidium rowmundi is a species of mite in the genus Trombidium in the family Trombidiidae. It is found in Poland.
The larvae of this species use spiders as a host.

References
 Synopsis of the described Arachnida of the World: Trombidiidae

Further reading
  (1996): Seven new larval species of mites (Acari, Prostigmata: Erythraeidae and Trombidiidae) from Poland. Wiad Parazytol. 42(4): 443-460.

Trombidiidae
Arachnids of Europe
Animals described in 1996